Rondaniella is a genus of fungus gnats in the family Mycetophilidae. There are about nine described species in Rondaniella.

Species
These nine species belong to the genus Rondaniella:
R. aspidoida Yu & Wu, 2004
R. dimidiata (Meigen, 1804)
R. gutianshanana Yu & Wu, 2008
R. japonica (Matsumura, 1915)
R. rufiseta Edwards, 1932
R. schistocauda Yu & Wu, 2004
R. simplex Yu & Wu, 2008
R. unguiculata Yu & Wu, 2008
† L. interrupta (Loew, 1850)

References

Further reading

External links

 

Mycetophilidae
Articles created by Qbugbot
Bibionomorpha genera